Marriage is a 1929 German silent film directed by Eberhard Frowein and starring Lil Dagover.

Cast
In alphabetical order:
 Lil Dagover
 Gustav Diessl
 Maria Matray
 Livio Pavanelli
 Daisy Spies
 Ernst Stahl-Nachbaur
 Antonie Strassmann
 Max Terpis
 Hertha von Walther
 Hanna Waag

References

Bibliography 
 Ginsberg, Terri & Mensch, Andrea (ed.) A Companion to German Cinema. John Wiley & Sons, 2012.

External links 
 

1929 films
Films of the Weimar Republic
German silent feature films
Films directed by Eberhard Frowein
German black-and-white films
Films based on non-fiction books
1920s German films